The 1962 Icelandic Cup was the third edition of the National Football Cup.

It took place between 12 August 1962 and 21 October 1962, with the final played at Melavöllur in Reykjavik between KR Reykjavik and IA Akranes. Teams from the Úrvalsdeild karla (1st division) did not enter until the quarter finals. In prior rounds, teams from the 2. Deild (2nd division), as well as reserve teams, played in one-legged matches. In case of a draw, the match was replayed.

For the third consecutive year, KR Reykjavik reached the final, beating Fram Reykjavik 3 - 0.

First round

Second round 
 Entrance of Reynir Sandgerði, ÍB Hafnarfjörður and Keflavík ÍF

Third round

Quarter finals 
 Entrance of 6 clubs from 1. Deild

Semi finals

Final

See also 

 1962 Úrvalsdeild
 Icelandic Cup

External links 
 1961 Icelandic Cup results at the site of the Icelandic Football Federation 

Icelandic Men's Football Cup
Iceland
1962 in Iceland